The Zone: Survival Mission is a South Korean streaming television program starring Yoo Jae-suk, Lee Kwang-soo, and Kwon Yuri. Dubbed as the "agents of mankind", the members are put into eight disaster simulations in which they must must survive for four hours. It premiered on Disney+ on September 8, 2022, with the first three episodes being released at the same time.

The series is produced by Cho Hyo-jin, who has frequently collaborated with Yoo Jae-suk and is known for his previous shows such as Running Man, X-Man, and Family Outing.

On November 30, 2022, it was confirmed that second season would be in production.

Premise
In each episode, the cast is put into survival-themed simulations through "The Zone" with the assistance of AI U (voiced by You Hee-yeol), an artificial intelligence machine. Their task is to complete missions and endure the scenarios in 4 hours.

Episodes

References

South Korean variety television shows
2022 South Korean television series debuts
Star (Disney+) original programming